Gray squirrel or grey squirrel may refer to several species of squirrel indigenous to North America:
The eastern gray squirrel (Sciurus carolinensis), from the eastern United States and southeastern Canada; introduced into the United Kingdom, Ireland, western North America, Italy, and South Africa
The western gray squirrel (Sciurus griseus), from the western United States
The Arizona gray squirrel (Sciurus arizonensis), from the southwestern United States and adjacent Mexico
The Mexican gray squirrel (Sciurus aureogaster), from southern Mexico and Guatemala; introduced into the Florida Keys

Sciurus